The 50th Street station is a bi-level station on the IND Eighth Avenue and Queens Boulevard Lines of the New York City Subway, located at 50th Street and Eighth Avenue in the Hell's Kitchen neighborhood of Manhattan.

History 
On December 9, 1924, the New York City Board of Transportation (BOT) gave preliminary approval to the construction of a subway line along Eighth Avenue, running from 207th Street. In June 1930, the BOT approved a list of planned stations on the new line, including a stop at 50th Street. Originally, the BOT did not plan for a 50th Street station on the Queens Boulevard Line. This station was to have only been served by Eighth Avenue trains heading north toward 168th Street in Washington Heights. The Eighth Avenue Association petitioned the BOT for an additional stop at 50th Street. On November 21, 1926, it was announced that the BOT had agreed to construct a stop at this location for the Queens Boulevard Line. In October 1928, the BOT awarded a $444,000 contract to Charles Mead & Co. for the completion of the 50th Street, 59th Street, and 72nd Street stations on the Eighth Avenue Line.

The upper level opened on September 10, 1932, as part of the city-operated Independent Subway System (IND)'s initial segment, the Eighth Avenue Line between Chambers Street and 207th Street. Construction of the whole line cost $191.2 million. The lower level opened on August 19, 1933 with the opening of the IND Queens Boulevard Line to Roosevelt Avenue in Queens.

Station layout 

This bi-level station has six tracks and four side platforms in total. The upper level is located on the Eighth Avenue Line and is fed by Eighth Avenue local trains from Central Park West and has four tracks and two side platforms. The center express tracks carry Eighth Avenue express trains during the day, and do not have any platforms. Fare control is at platform level.

The lower level is on the Queens Boulevard Line and has two tracks and two side platforms, separated by a curtain wall for the majority of the station. At the northern end of the station, the curtain wall is not present and the two side platforms are in full view of each other. The northbound track of the lower level is fed by the northbound local and express tracks at 42nd Street. In the southbound direction, lower level trains may access either the Eighth Avenue local or express tracks; until 2003, they also had the option of running to the abandoned lower level of 42nd Street. The two levels are offset, with the upper level running from 50th to 52nd Streets and the lower from 49th to 51st Streets. Neither level has crossover or crossunder between directions, although level-to-level transfer in the same direction is possible.

The platform walls on both levels have no trim line, but there are mosaic name tablets reading "50TH ST." in white sans-serif lettering on an Ultra Violet background with black border. Small tile captions reading "50" in white lettering on black run in regular intervals between the name tablets, and are also present on the lower level's curtain wall. Blueberry I-beam columns run along all the platforms at regular intervals, alternating ones having the standard black station name plate with white lettering.

An untitled etched-granite piece of artwork by Matt Mulligan was installed on the downtown upper-level platform in 1989 and features neighborhood life.

The station is being renovated as part of the 2010–2014 MTA Capital Program. As of an MTA study conducted in 2015, at least 37% of components were out of date.

Exits
The southbound side of 50th Street has an expanded mezzanine area, with exits to 49th and 50th Streets. It also has two ADA-accessible elevators (one from the street to the mezzanine, the other from the mezzanine to the lower-level platform). A ramp leads from the mezzanine to the upper-level platform; it was constructed during the development of the Worldwide Plaza complex. The downtown side has an escalator to the lower level. The mezzanine contains stairs and escalators to One Worldwide Plaza's facade at the northwest corner of Eighth Avenue and 49th Street. There are also two street stairs to the southwest corner of that intersection, as well as one street stair to either western corner of Eighth Avenue and 50th Street.

In contrast to the downtown platforms, the uptown platforms lack elevators and are not ADA-accessible. Renovation, including addition of an elevator on the uptown side of the station, was planned for the 2005–2009 MTA Capital Program and was to reopen many closed stairways to the lower level; however, these were not funded. There is one street stair from this platform to either eastern corner of Eighth Avenue and 50th Street; the southeast stair is located inside a building. An additional stair is located at the northeast corner of Eighth Avenue and 51st Street.

There are several closed exits from the station to the street, primarily at the north end of the station. These include stairs from all four corners of Eighth Avenue and 52nd Streets. A closed exit goes from the downtown platforms to the southwest corner of 51st Street and Eighth Avenue; this mirrors the exit to the same street from the uptown platforms. An additional closed exit from the uptown platforms is located at the southeast corner of 49th Street and Eighth Avenue; this mirrors the exit to the same street from the downtown platforms.

References

External links 

 
 nycsubway.org — Untitled Artwork by Matt Mullican (1989)
 Station Reporter — C Train
 Station Reporter — E Train
 MTA's Arts For Transit — 50th Street (IND Eighth Avenue Line)
 50th Street entrance from Google Maps Street View
 51st Street entrance from Google Maps Street View
 49th Street entrance from Google Maps Street View
 Platform from Google Maps Street View

IND Eighth Avenue Line stations
Eighth Avenue (Manhattan)
IND Queens Boulevard Line stations
1932 establishments in New York City
New York City Subway stations in Manhattan
Railway stations in the United States opened in 1932
New York City Subway transfer stations
Hell's Kitchen, Manhattan